Taxi Media is a taxi advertising company based in London, UK. On 1 September 2011, Taxi Media was acquired by VeriFone and now operates as VeriFone Media. It was previously owned by Clear Channel but was acquired by Taxi Promotions in 2009 for several million pounds. In 2010, the technology and electronic payments company Verifone acquired Taxi Media from Clear Channel Outdoor.

It was reported that Taxi Media was in discussion with the Organising Committee of the 2012 Olympic games. They have also opened a new design and print studio to strengthen its facilities.

Notable clients
Notable clients include MAC Cosmetics, Fortnum & Mason, Linkedin, and TFL.

Promotions
In the past Taxi Media has been known to offer free taxi rides as a way of promoting taxi advertising in London. A famous case of this was in 2006 when Taxi Media offered free cab rides for 10 weeks.

Taxi Media made headlines in the outdoor advertising arena when they announced they would be offering two week advertising campaigns. This was the first of its kind in the UK. 
From the start of a campaign through to completion, Taxi Media advise on what will work well on a taxi format. This includes concept art mock-ups, artwork creation, print relationships, special build sourcing, quality assurance, campaign photography and videography.
Taxi Media’s brand activation services span from VIP chauffeuring, product sampling to showcasing adverts on various formats. In a campaign launched by opera singer Katherine Jenkins, the finest materials were used to bring Lindt & Sprüngli's Lindor ‘Moment of Bliss’ proposition to the forefront of the consumer experience. As well as presenting the perfect opportunity to travel in style, passengers were prompted to enjoy complimentary Lindor truffles, with dedicated messages on the digital screen inside the taxi.

Taxi advertising formats
There are many formats of taxi advertising that have been popularised in the UK. A full Livery or Taxi Wrap is whereby the entire black cab is covered in an advertisement. Other formats are Supersides, digital tops and digital screens inside the taxi.

In 2001, Taxi Media began offering advertising on the flip up seats inside.

In 2001, Taxi Media began offering advertising on flip up seats. 

Taxi Media have since offered branded receipts as a means of advertising.

References 

Advertising agencies of the United Kingdom
Marketing companies established in 1980
Defunct companies based in London
1980 establishments in the United Kingdom